The 2021 Everest Premier League, also known as EPL4 or Bajaj Pulsar EPL for sponsorship reasons, was the fourth edition of the Everest Premier League, a professional men's domestic Twenty20 cricket competition in Nepal. The event was initially scheduled for December 2019, before being postponed multiple times. Lalitpur Patriots were the defending champions, having won their first title in 2018, but were eliminated in the group stage after finishing fifth.

Background
The fourth edition of the Everest Premier League was originally scheduled to be held from 8 to 22 December 2019, but was rescheduled to run from 29 February to 14 March 2020. but was rescheduled again, to run from 14 to 28 March 2020. On 5 March, the event was postponed again due to the coronavirus pandemic. In February 2021, the 2021 Everest Premier League dates were announced by the Cricket Association of Nepal as 25 September – 9 October 2021. The dates were chosen to coincide with the Vijayadashami festival in Nepal. All matches will be played at the Tribhuvan University International Cricket Ground in Kathmandu.

The prize money for the competition has been doubled from the 2018 edition, and will be 5 million nepalese rupees (NPR). The runners-up will earn 1.5 million NPR.

Venues

Squads

Points table

The top four teams qualify for the playoffs.
 advance to Qualifier 1.
 advance to Eliminator.

League matches

The schedule was published on 8 September 2021.

Playoff stage

Preliminary

Qualifier 1

Eliminator

Qualifier 2

Final

References

External links 
 
 Series home at ESPNcricinfo

Everest Premier League
Everest Premier League
Everest Premier League, 2020
2021 in Nepalese cricket